Acinetobacter pakistanensis is a Gram-negative, strictly aerobic , psychrotolerant, heavy metal-tolerant and non-motile bacterium from the genus Acinetobacter which has been isolated from a textile dyeing wastewater treatment pond in Islamabad in Pakistan.

References

External links
Type strain of Acinetobacter pakistanensis at BacDive -  the Bacterial Diversity Metadatabase	

Moraxellaceae
Bacteria described in 2015